The Children of Llullaillaco, also known as the Mummies of Llullaillaco, are three Inca child mummies discovered on 16 March 1999 by Johan Reinhard and his archaeological team near the summit of Llullaillaco, a  stratovolcano on the Argentina–Chile border. The children were sacrificed in an Inca religious ritual that took place around the year 1500. In this ritual, the three children were drugged with coca and alcohol then placed inside a small chamber  beneath the ground, where they were left to die. Archaeologists consider them as being among the best-preserved mummies in the world.

On 20 June 2001, Argentina's National Commission of Museums, Monuments and Historic Places declared the Children of Llullaillaco to be National Historic Property of Argentina. Since 2007 the mummies have been on exhibition in the Museum of High Altitude Archaeology in the Argentine city of Salta.

Background

The Inca Empire (Quechua: Tawantinsuyu, "The Four Regions"), was the largest empire in pre-Columbian America, and possibly the largest empire in the world during the early 16th century. The empire arose in the area around the city of Cusco, high in the Andes Mountains in modern-day Peru, in the 13th century. The Inca civilisation did not expand much geographically until the mid-15th century. However starting under the rule of Pachacuti in 1438 the Inca swept throughout South America along the Andes mountains, conquering local peoples along the way and consolidating a massive land empire within the span of less than a century.  The Inca Empire reached its maximum geographical extent around 1530 and then began a rapid decline culminating in the fall of Cusco in 1533, along with the execution of the emperor Atahualpa by conquering Spaniards.

Child sacrifice, referred to as capacocha or qhapaq hucha, was an important part of the Inca religion and was often used to commemorate important events, such as the death of a Sapa Inca. Human sacrifice was also used as an offering to the gods in times of famine and as a way of asking for protection. Sacrifice could occur only with the direct approval of the Inca emperor. Children were chosen from all over the sprawling Inca empire and were picked primarily based on their "physical perfection". Children chosen for sacrifice were generally "sons and daughters of nobles and local rulers". They were then taken hundreds or thousands of miles to Cusco, the capital, where they were the subject of important purification rituals. From there the children were sent to high mountaintops throughout the empire to be sacrificed. According to traditional Inca belief, children who are sacrificed do not truly die but instead watch over the land from their mountaintop perches, alongside their ancestors. The Inca considered it a great honour to die as a sacrifice.

Many other well-preserved mummies, such as Mummy Juanita, have also been found on Andean mountaintops.

Burial site

It sits in the Andes mountains on the modern border separating Chile and Argentina. The burial site was covered by five feet of earth and rock at the time of discovery. The site where the mummies were found has been described as "the world's highest archaeological site".

Llullaillaco is in the Atacama Desert, the driest non-polar desert on Earth. The extreme dryness of the air is a major reason for the excellent preservation of the mummies for 500 years. Dryness and cold temperatures are both known to significantly reduce the decomposition rate of human remains, and the extreme environmental conditions at the summit of Llullaillaco are therefore very conducive to preservation.

Rediscovery

In 1999 Johan Reinhard and his team of researchers set out into the high Andes to search for Inca ritual sacrifice sites. Three days into their search Reinhard's team discovered a grave site containing three mummified children: two girls and one boy. Several gold, shell and silver statues, textiles and pottery were also found. The younger girl's body had been struck by lightning after her death, causing burn damage on her body, especially her face and shoulder. The other two mummies were not affected. Statues made of precious metals and textiles were among the many goods found in the graves.

Several times the expedition came close to failure. After a long acclimatization process, including a month spent exploring a lower-elevation mountain nearby, the team finally approached the summit of Llullaillaco after establishing a series of camps throughout the ascent. According to Reinhard the team "[was] about to give up" when they spotted an artificial layer in the site that indicated they should continue the investigation. The researchers followed the artificial layer, which eventually led them to the burial of one of the mummies.

The mummies
Three mummies were found at the Llullaillaco burial site: la doncella (the maiden), la niña del rayo (the lightning girl) and el niño (the boy). Once at the top of the mountain they had been allowed to fall asleep and then placed in a small tomb  underground, where they were left to die. In addition they had been fed a high-protein diet before being sacrificed.

The mummies were in exceptional condition when found. Reinhard said that the mummies "appear to be the best preserved Inca mummies ever found", also saying that the arms were perfectly preserved, even down to the individual hairs. The internal organs were still intact and one of the hearts still contained frozen blood. Because the mummies froze before dehydration could occur, the desiccation and shrivelling of the organs that is typical of exposed human remains never took place.

La doncella

The oldest mummy, a girl found to be around the age of fifteen, was dubbed la doncella. She has become widely known as the "Maiden of Llullaillaco". A bacterial infection was discovered in her lungs during an examination. She wore a dress with her hair elaborately braided, along with a feather-adorned headdress. She died in her sleep.

It is believed that La Doncella was an aclla, or Sun Virgin – she was a virgin, chosen and sanctified at around the age of ten years, to live with other girls and women who would become royal wives, priestesses and sacrifices.  The practice of ritual sacrifice in Inca society was intended to ensure health, rich harvests and favourable weather.

La niña del rayo

La niña del rayo was approximately six years old when she was sacrificed. Her face, one of her ears and part of her shoulder were damaged by a lightning strike that occurred after her death. Her head was lifted high and she was facing south-west. She was wearing a traditional light brown acsu dress and her head, along with part of her body, was wrapped in a thick woollen blanket. In addition her entire body was wrapped in another blanket, this one embroidered in red and yellow. Her skull appears to have been intentionally elongated.

La niña del rayo appears to have been treated less roughly than el niño but without the care with which la doncella was treated.

El niño

The body of el niño, who was about seven years old when he was sacrificed, had been tightly wrapped, since some of his ribs and pelvis were dislocated. He apparently died under stress, since vomit and blood were found on his clothing. There also appeared to be an infestation of nits in his hair. He was the only child to be tied up. Lying in the fetal position, he was wearing a gray tunic, a silver bracelet and leather shoes and had been wrapped in a red and brown blanket. The skull of el niño had been slightly elongated, similarly to that of la niña del rayo. Owing to the way in which he was tied up, it is believed that he may have died of suffocation.

El niño was buried with a collection of small objects, some of them depicting finely dressed men driving caravans of llamas.  A woolen sling was wrapped around his head; slings were used by men in a ritual activity to launch stones into the lagoons at the end of the dry season to hasten the coming of the rains.

Scientific analysis

According to a biochemical analysis of la doncella's hair, the children had been drugged with alcohol and coca before the start of the sacrificial ritual. La Doncella had been drugged by coca leaves and a maize beer known as chicha. Though all three of the sacrifices had consumed significant amounts of these substances prior to the ritual, a hair sample analysis shows that la doncella had consumed significantly more coca and alcohol than either el niño or la niña del rayo. Her hair contained the highest concentration of coca ever found in Andean human remains.

Exhibition

The area that now contains the city of Salta was a part of the Inca Empire in the late 1400s and early 1500s, before being conquered by Spanish conquistadores in the late 1500s. To prevent deterioration, a computer-controlled climate system maintains environmental conditions similar to those on Llullaillaco. If an earthquake or other emergency were to result in the loss of power, the aeroplane of the provincial governor would be used to fly the mummies to another location where they would be able to be "plugged back in". The museum opened its doors to the general public in early September 2007.

Developing a way to show the mummies to the public while keeping them perfectly preserved took eight years of research.

Controversy
The mummies have been the subject of controversy, especially with regards to indigenous rights. The exhumation and display of the bodies is opposed by some indigenous people.

Rogelio Guanuco, the leader of the Indigenous Association of Argentina (AIRA), called the display "a violation of our loved ones", saying that "Llullaillaco continues to be sacred for us. They should never have profaned that sanctuary, and they should not put our children on exhibition as if in a circus." Fermín Tolaba, chief of the Lules, said that the mummies "should have stayed in their territory", and that "now that [the mummies] are already exhumed, [the museum] would have to return them. It is not good that the museum is earning money with that, charging an admission for something that doesn’t belong to it."

The high Andes region from which the mummies were taken is believed to be home to at least 40 other similar ritual burial sites. However, in order to "have good relations with the Indian people", no more mummies will be removed from the area, according to Gabriel Miremont, the designer and director of the Museum of High Altitude Archaeology, which hosts the exhibit displaying the mummies. Other indigenous people supported the research, however. The Third World Congress of the Quechua Language in late 2004 brought together 300 representatives from Andean countries, at its conclusion the congress passed a resolution "The congress approves supporting investigations of the Llullaillaco Children (Salta, Argentina) and the diffusion of such investigations for recognizing the greatness and the evolution of our ancestors from their origins to the present day."

Some indigenous leaders have also expressed concern that indigenous peoples will not receive possible economic benefits created by the display of the mummies.

See also

 Mummy Juanita
 Ötzi
 Plomo Mummy

References

Bibliography
 Reinhard, Johan: The Ice Maiden: Inca Mummies, Mountain Gods, and Sacred Sites in the Andes. National Geographic Society, Washington, D.C., 2005.
 Reinhard, Johan and Ceruti, María Constanza: "Inca Rituals and Sacred Mountains: A Study of the World's Highest Archaeological Sites" Los Angeles: UCLA, 2010.
 Reinhard, Johan and Ceruti, María Constanza: Investigaciones arqueológicas en el Volcán Llullaillaco: Complejo ceremonial incaico de alta montaña. Salta: EUCASA, 2000.
 Reinhard, Johan and Ceruti, María Constanza: "Sacred Mountains, Ceremonial Sites and Human Sacrifice Among the Incas." Archaeoastronomy 19: 1–43, 2006.
 Ceruti, María Constanza: Llullaillaco: Sacrificios y Ofrendas en un Santuario Inca de Alta Montaña. Salta: EUCASA, 2003.
 Reinhard, Johan: "Llullaillaco: An Investigation of the World's Highest Archaeological Site." Latin American Indian Literatures Journal 9(1): 31–54, 1993.
 Beorchia, Antonio: "El cementerio indígena del volcán Llullaillaco." Revista del Centro de Investigaciones Arqueológicas de Alta Montaña 2: 36–42, 1975, San Juan.
 Previgliano, Carlos, Constanza Ceruti, Johan Reinhard, Facundo Arias, and Josefina Gonzalez: "Radiologic Evaluation of the Llullaillaco Mummies." American Journal of Roentgenology 181: 1473–1479, 2003.
 
 Complete description, history, place name and routes of Llullaillaco in Andeshandbook
 Museum of High Mountain Archaeology 
 

1999 archaeological discoveries
Archaeology of Argentina
Archaeology of Chile
Human remains (archaeological)
Human sacrifice
Andean mummies
History of Antofagasta Region